, son of Yukinori with Tokugawa Senhime (1706-1757), was a kugyō or Japanese court noble of the Edo period (1603–1868). He adopted his uncle Naozane as his son.

References
 

1725 births
1743 deaths
Fujiwara clan
Kujō family